Adolfo Battaglia (born 10 February 1930) is an Italian journalist who served as the minister of industry, commerce and craftsmanship between 1987 and 1991 in three successive cabinets. He was a long-term member of the Chamber of Deputies.

Biography
Born in Viterbo in 1930, Battaglia obtained a bachelor's degree in law in Rome in 1953. In 1965 he joined the Republican Party, serving as a member of the party's national directorate and then its deputy political secretary. Within the party Battaglia was part of the pro-socialist faction.

Battaglia served as a deputy for six terms between the legislatures VI and XI. He was first elected to the Chamber of Deputies in 1972 from the Republican Party. He was also worked as an undersecretary for foreign affairs for two terms. He was the minister of industry, commerce and craftsmanship in the cabinets of Goria, De Mita and Andreotti. In 1991 he was appointed minister of state holdings to the cabinet led by Giulio Andreotti, but like the other designated ministers from the Republican Party Battaglia did not take an oath due to the veto by the Italian Socialist Party on the appointment of Giuseppe Galasso to the Ministry of Telecommunications. He left the Italian Republican Party in 1994 and joined the Democratic Party of the Left of which he was a member of the national direction before he retired from politics.  

Battaglia worked as a journalist from 1958 and contributed to many publications, including Il Mondo, Panorama, La Stampa, Corriere della Sera, Il Giorno and Il Messaggero. He was the director of La Voce Repubblicana newspaper from 1967 to 1972.

References

External links

20th-century Italian journalists
21st-century Italian journalists
1930 births
Government ministers of Italy
Living people
Italian newspaper editors
Deputies of Legislature VI of Italy
Deputies of Legislature VII of Italy
Deputies of Legislature VIII of Italy
Deputies of Legislature IX of Italy
Deputies of Legislature X of Italy
Deputies of Legislature XI of Italy
Italian Republican Party politicians
Democratic Party of the Left politicians
People from Viterbo